The women's 400 metres events were held on each day of the 2021 World Para Athletics European Championships in Bydgoszcz, Poland.

Medalists

See also
List of IPC world records in athletics

References

400 metres
2021 in women's athletics
400 metres at the World Para Athletics European Championships